Gorgyra subflavidus is a butterfly in the family Hesperiidae. It is found along the coasts of Kenya and Tanzania and in Mozambique (from the coast to the north). The habitat consists of forests.

References

Butterflies described in 1896
Erionotini
Butterflies of Africa